Mexico competed at the 1936 Summer Olympics in Berlin, Germany. 32 competitors, all men, took part in 15 events in 8 sports.

Medalists

Athletics

Track & road events

Field events

Basketball

Summary

Team roster

First Round

Second Round

Second Consolation Round

Third Round

Quarterfinals

Semifinals

Bronze Medal Match

Boxing

Diving

Fencing

Modern pentathlon

Polo

Shooting

References

External links
Official Olympic Reports
International Olympic Committee results database

Nations at the 1936 Summer Olympics
1936
1936 in Mexican sports